The Law Firm is an American reality competition series which aired on NBC from July 28, 2005, until August 4, 2005. It features up-and-coming lawyers competing against each other while trying real court cases with real clients, in front of real judges and juries, resulting in outcomes that are final, legal and binding for the parties. The grand prize is $250,000. Trial attorney and legal analyst Roy Black is the managing partner of The Law Firm. As managing partner, Black decides who will be eliminated each week.

5.08 million viewers tuned into the premiere and later dipped to 4.04 million for its second episode thus leading NBC to pull the series off the air. The remaining episodes aired on Bravo.

Contestants
Michael Cavalluzzi
Olivier Taillieu
Deep Goswami
Aileen Page
Christopher Smith
Keith Bruno
Regina Silva
Barrett Rubens
Anika Harvey
Barrett Elizabeth Rubens
Jason Adams
Kelly Chang

References

External links
 
 

2000s American reality television series
2005 American television series debuts
2005 American television series endings
English-language television shows
Bravo (American TV network) original programming
NBC original programming
Court shows
Television series by 20th Century Fox Television